Eendekuil is a settlement in West Coast District Municipality in the Western Cape province of South Africa.

Situated 30 km (19 mi) north of Piketberg, the village was the terminus of the Cape Town railway until the end of the Anglo-Boer War, and it remains the railhead for the Citrusdal region, which lies on the other side of the Olifants River.

References

Populated places in the Bergrivier Local Municipality